Radio One 91.3 (DXNA 91.3 MHz) is an FM station owned and operated by M.I.T. Radio Television Network. Its studios and transmitter are located at Magsaysay Ave., Brgy. Lower Loboc, Oroquieta.

References

External links
Good Morning Oroquieta FB Page

Radio stations in Misamis Occidental